The 9 municipalities of the Päijät-Häme Region in Finland constitute a single sub-region:



Lahti Sub-region

Lahti area 
Asikkala
Hollola
Kärkölä
Iitti (Itis)
Lahti (Lahtis)
Orimattila
Padasjoki

Heinola area 
Hartola (Gustav Adolfs)
Heinola
Sysmä

See also 
Southern Finland
Regions of Southern Finland

External links